Liberty Street Historic District may refer to:

 Liberty Street Historic District (San Francisco, California), listed on the National Register of Historic Places (NRHP) in San Francisco, California
 Liberty Street Historic District (Bath, New York), listed on the NRHP in New York